Jonathan Tonge is an academic based in the Department of Politics Studies at the University of Liverpool. In 2008-9 he was chair of the British Youth Citizenship Commission. In 2012 Tonge and Professor Philip Cowley became co-editors of the Parliamentary Affairs academic journal.

Selected publications

References

External links
Academic profile

Academics of the University of Liverpool
Living people
British political scientists
Year of birth missing (living people)